Matthew W.  "Matt" Crouch /kraʊtʃ/ (born October 26, 1961) is an American broadcaster, on-air personality, and filmmaker. A second-generation television producer and executive, he is currently president of Trinity Broadcasting Network (TBN), and serves as the primary host (along with his wife Laurie) of the network's flagship program Praise.

Personal life
The younger of Paul and Jan Crouch's two children, Matt was born in Muskegon, Michigan, where his parents worked as assistant pastors at a local Assemblies of God outpost.  The family later moved to California, where his parents would co-found Trinity Broadcasting Network in 1973.

Crouch married Laurie Orndorff on August 25, 1985. They are the parents of two sons, Caylan and Cody.

Career
Along with his older brother Paul Crouch Jr., Crouch spent his youth working behind the scenes at TBN in its early years.  Crouch eventually rose to producing the network's flagship program, Praise The Lord, by the mid-1980s.  Crouch later produced a Christian music video series, Real Videos, and a children's program, Kids' Club, for the network with his wife Laurie.

In 1995 Matt and Laurie Crouch co-founded Gener8Xion Entertainment, a Christian film studio based in Hollywood.  Crouch was producer or executive producer for all of the studio's productions, such as The Omega Code (1999), Megiddo: The Omega Code 2 (2001), One Night with the King (2006), and Noëlle (2007). In 2009 Crouch co-directed the documentary feature The Cross: The Arthur Blessitt Story.

In 2010 Matt and Laurie Crouch resigned their positions at Gener8Xion Entertainment and sold their shares.  Crouch subsequently joined TBN's staff full-time as a vice-president, eventually becoming president in 2012 when his father Paul Sr. symbolically "passed the torch" to become the head of TBN operations. In addition to his role managing TBN's day-to-day operations, Crouch and Laurie also appear as hosts of Praise the Lord, TBN's signature nightly program.

In 2015, he became the president of Trinity Broadcasting Network.

References

External links
 Official TBN website
 
 
 Gener8Xion Entertainment
 "God, Mammon and 'Bibleman' article by Newsweek

1961 births
Living people
20th-century evangelicals
21st-century evangelicals
American evangelicals
Christians from Michigan
Crouch family
Film directors from Michigan
Film producers from Michigan
Pentecostals from California
People from Muskegon, Michigan